This list of museums in Tyne and Wear, England contains museums which are defined for this context as institutions (including nonprofit organizations, government entities, and private businesses) that collect and care for objects of cultural, artistic, scientific, or historical interest and make their collections or related exhibits available for public viewing. Also included are non-profit art galleries and university art galleries.  Museums that exist only in cyberspace (i.e., virtual museums) are not included.

Defunct museums

 Dial Cottage, West Moor, Killingworth, one of the homes of George Stephenson from 1804 and where the infant Robert Stephenson grew up
 Military Vehicle Museum, Exhibition Park, Newcastle, closed in 2006, may reopen
 Municipal Museum of Science and Industry, Exhibition Park, Newcastle, collections now part of Discovery Museum
 Museum of Antiquities, collections now part of Great North Museum: Hancock
 Shefton Museum, collections now part of Great North Museum: Hancock

References

See also
:Category:Tourist attractions in Tyne and Wear

 
Tyne and Wear
Museums